The Great Western Railway (GWR) 1600 Class is a class of 0-6-0 pannier tank steam locomotive designed for light branch lines, short-distance freight transfers and shunting duties.

History
The class was based on the 2021 class designed by Dean and built from 1897 onwards. The 2021 class was in its turn an enlargement of the 850 class designed by Armstrong in 1874.

Construction and operations
The 1600 Class was a pure GWR design but all 70 were built by the Western Region of British Railways. When the last member of the class was built in 1955, the basic design was over 80 years old; No. 1669 was the last one built, and in turn was the last GWR-design locomotive constructed at Swindon Works. BR gave the 1600 class the power classification 2F. Two locomotives (1646 and 1649) were transferred to the Scottish Region in 1957 and 1958 to operate the Dornoch Light Railway.  The class's service life was short; withdrawals started in 1959 and all were gone by 1966, with 1659 having the shortest service (built 1955, withdrawn 1960). Two were sold for further use to the National Coal Board: 1600 in 1959 (scrapped 1963), and 1607 in 1965 (scrapped 1970). The last three in BR service were Nos. 1628, 1638 and 1660, all withdrawn from Croes Newydd shed.

Preservation 

No. 1638 was the only member of the class to have been preserved. It was purchased in 1966 from BR for the Dart Valley Railway. In 1992 it was sold to its present home on the Kent and East Sussex Railway, and is currently operational after its latest overhaul was completed in 2016.

See also
 GWR 0-6-0PT – list of classes of GWR 0-6-0 pannier tank, including table of preserved locomotives

References

External links 
 1600 tank class

0-6-0PT locomotives
1600
Railway locomotives introduced in 1949
Standard gauge steam locomotives of Great Britain